Holifield is a surname. Notable people with the surname include:

Chester E. Holifield (1903–1995), United States Representative from California
John Holifield (born 1964), American football running back for the West Virginia Mountaineers

See also
Mike Hollifield (born 1961), English footballer 
Holyfield (surname)

See also
Ruthie Bolton-Holifield (born 1967), former collegiate, Olympic and professional basketball player